Airbus Hamburg-Finkenwerder, also known as Hamburg Finkenwerder Airport , is an aircraft manufacturing plant and associated private airport in the Finkenwerder quarter of southwest Hamburg, Germany. The airport is an integral part of the Airbus-owned plant, and is exclusively used by that company for corporate, freight, test and delivery flights, including those of the former Airbus A380.

History
In 1933, the Blohm & Voss shipbuilding company in Hamburg decided to diversify into aircraft manufacture, believing that there would soon be a market for all-metal, long-range flying boats, especially with the German state airline Deutsche Luft Hansa. It also felt that its experience with all-metal marine construction would prove an advantage. In order to do this, it created the Hamburger Flugzeugbau (HFB) as a subsidiary company. Initially manufacturing was carried out at the Blohm & Voss shipbuilding works, with an inland airfield and final assembly building for landplanes at Wenzendorf Aircraft Factory.

In 1937, the HFB was reconstituted as a operating division of Blohm & Voss rather than as a separate company, and the Finkenwerder aircraft works and associated airfield were established in 1939 by this division. The works were substantially undamaged during World War II, and when manufacturing was revived there, using the previous HFB company identity, the facilities began a long series of progressive expansions and modernizations.  

During the Berlin Airlift, detachments from both No. 201 Squadron RAF and No. 230 Squadron RAF flew Short Sunderland V's.

In 1964, both the HFB 320 Hansa Jet and the third prototype Transall C-160 made their first flights from the airport. Through a series of mergers and acquisitions, HFB and its Finkenwerder facility eventually became part of Airbus.

Between April 2006 and July 2007, the runway was extended at the southern end, increasing its length from 2,684 m to 3,183 m, in order to accommodate the planned freight version of the Airbus A380.

The foundations of the Fink II submarine pen are extant, just east of the north end of the runway.

Design
There is a Styling Department of Interiors at the ZAL Centre for Applied Aviation Research GmbH Building and Research with Hydrogen for future Combustive.

Manufacturing

The Airbus site at Finkenwerder is the main operations centre for Airbus Operations GmbH and employs around 15,000 people. The Hamburg factory manufactures and equips the forward and rear fuselage sections of the A330 and A350 XWB. Final assembly is carried out for all models of the A320 family, plus fitting-out of their cabin interiors and painting for final delivery. A large global spares centre is also maintained, holding some 120,000 parts, as well as A320 series maintenance-training facilities. The airport forms an integral part of these manufacturing operations.

Airport flights
There are no public scheduled services at Finkenwerder. The airport handles around 10 to 15 aircraft movements per day. Most are transfer, freight, and test flights for Airbus manufacturing. The twice-daily corporate shuttle service to the Airbus plant in Toulouse has been operated by the Spanish operator Volotea since 4 November 2019 on a five-year contract. Previously the service was operated by Germania.

Incidents and accidents
 In 1967 the pilot of a Spantax Convair 990 Coronado mistook the 1360 m long runway of Finkenwerder for the 3000 m long runway of Hamburg Airport in Fuhlsbüttel, and only just brought the aircraft to a stop before the end of the runway.

See also
 Hamburg Airport
 Transport in Germany
 List of airports in Germany

References

Citations

Bibliography

External links

 
 

Aircraft assembly plants in Germany
Finki
Buildings and structures in Hamburg-Mitte
1939 establishments in Germany
Airbus